Xenorhina mehelyi is a species of frog in the family Microhylidae.
It is found in Papua New Guinea and possibly Indonesia.
Its natural habitats are subtropical or tropical moist lowland forests and subtropical or tropical moist montane forests.

References

Xenorhina
Amphibians of Papua New Guinea
Taxonomy articles created by Polbot
Amphibians described in 1898